Pseudotaenia is a genus of beetles in the family Buprestidae, containing the following species:

 Pseudotaenia ajax (Saunders, 1872)
 Pseudotaenia frenchi (Blackburn, 1891)
 Pseudotaenia gigas (Hope, 1846)
 Pseudotaenia salamandra (Thomson, 1879)
 Pseudotaenia spilota Carter, 1916
 Pseudotaenia superba (Saunders, 1872)
 Pseudotaenia waterhousei (van de Poll, 1886)

References

Buprestidae genera